A , literally "hand-wiper", is a thin Japanese hand towel made from cotton. Usually the long sides are finished with a selvage, while the short sides are left unfinished to allow fraying.

A  may be used as a flannel (washcloth) or dishcloth. They are often used as headbands, souvenirs, decorations, or for wrapping bottles and similar items. Towels made from terry cloth have largely replaced  in household use. However,  are still popular as souvenirs, decorations, and as a head covering in kendo, where it functions as a sweatband and provides extra padding beneath the headgear.

References

External links

Tofugu, Tengui: A Cloth Without Limits An article describing  in detail.

Japanese culture
Shinto religious objects
History of art in Japan
Japanese words and phrases
Textile arts of Japan
Japanese headgear
Headgear